Harry Tyler may refer to:

Harry Walter Tyler (1863–1938), American chemist and university administrator
Harry Tyler (actor) (1888-1961), American actor in The Case of the Howling Dog and other films
Harry Tyler, a character in the 1968 film The Lost Continent, played by Tony Beckley
Harry Nelson Tyler, Atlanta, Georgia architect who worked with Haralson Bleckley

See also
Henry Tyler (disambiguation)
Harold Tyler (disambiguation)
Harrison Tyler (disambiguation)
Parker Tyler (Harrison Parker Tyler, 1904–1974)
Harrison and Tyler